Carlo Bergamini has been borne by at least two ships of the Italian Navy in honour of Carlo Bergamini and may refer to:

 , a  launched in 1960 and stricken in 1981.
 , a Bergamini (2011)-class frigate launched in 2011. 

Italian Navy ship names